Idmon obliquans, the small red bob, is a butterfly in the family Hesperiidae. It was described by Paul Mabille in 1893. It is found in the Indomalayan realm.

Subspecies
Idmon obliquans obliquans (southern Burma, Thailand, Malaysia, Singapore, Sumatra, Bangka, Java)
Idmon obliquans yamanta (Fruhstorfer, 1910) (Borneo)

References

Butterflies described in 1893
Ancistroidini
Butterflies of Asia